René Vignal (12 August 1926 – 21 November 2016) was a French footballer who played as a goalkeeper. He played for Toulouse, RC Paris and Béziers at club level as well as the France national team.

References
 Profile at FFF

1926 births
2016 deaths
Sportspeople from Béziers
French footballers
France international footballers
Association football goalkeepers
Racing Club de France Football players
Ligue 1 players
AS Béziers Hérault (football) players
Footballers from Occitania (administrative region)